The Port Talbot Railway Stephenson Class were eleven 0-6-2T locomotives introduced into traffic in 1898 designed and built by Robert Stephenson and Company. They predated the somewhat similar but larger Rhymney Railway M class by six years.

They were successful designs ideally suited to hauling coal trains a relatively short distance. Four of the class were nevertheless quickly sold, two to the Rhondda and Swansea Bay Railway in 1901, and two more to the Neath and Brecon Railway in 1903. This left seven to be absorbed into the Great Western Railway (GWR) in 1922.

In 1925, two were rebuilt with the then newly developed number 10 standard boiler and high domed cab by the GWR. In this form they were visually similar to a smaller version of the GWR 5600 Class introduced in 1924.

Welsh 0-6-2T types 

The numerous railways of South Wales had one thing in common apart from transporting coal in large quantities; their liking for the 0-6-2T type. The first was in 1885 on the Taff Vale Railway the design being by their mechanical engineer Tom Hurry Riches, father of Charles T. Hurry Riches who was the designer of the Rhymney Stephensons.

The suitability of the type was because the nature of the work they undertook demanded high adhesive weight, plenty of power with good braking ability, but no need for outright speed, nor large tanks or bunker as the distances from pit to port were short. These Welsh locomotives were taken over by the GWR at the grouping in 1923 and many, including seventeen of the Rhymney A, M, P and R's, were rebuilt with GWR taper boilers. All the Rhymney Stephenson-derived locos passed into British Railways (BR) ownership in 1948. Others included (with some gaps in numbering):

 Brecon and Merthyr Railway, BR numbers 431-436 
 Cardiff Railway, BR number 155 
 Rhymney Railway, BR numbers 35-83 
 Taff Vale Railway, BR numbers 204-399

For further information on these pre-grouping locomotives see Locomotives of the Great Western Railway.

See also
 Port Talbot Railway 0-8-2T (Sharp Stewart)
 Port Talbot Railway 0-8-2T (Cooke)

External links
Telford Steam Railway 5619 project 5643 6695

Port Talbot Railway and Docks Company locomotives
0-6-2T locomotives
Robert Stephenson and Company locomotives
Railway locomotives introduced in 1898
Scrapped locomotives
Standard gauge steam locomotives of Great Britain
Freight locomotives